Télé Lumière is the first Christian television station in Lebanon and the Arab world and was founded in 1991. Since 2003, it also broadcasts satellite programming worldwide under the name Noursat.

History

Télé Lumière meaning the "Television of Light" was founded in 1991 by a group of committed lay people: Late Charles Helou, a former President of Lebanon, Brother Nour, Jack Kallassi, Late George Frem (ex. MP and minister), George Moawad, Rola and Sana Nassar, Dr. Antoine Saad and Christiane Debbaneh.

Télé Lumière is a non-profit organization, its mission is ecumenical, it is not associated to any political party or movement, do not broadcast any political views and do not accept or promote any commercial endorsements. As a non profit broadcasting station, it has no lucrative purposes and survives only from various donations given by its supporters and friends.
The Church cooperated with this television station since the beginning when she found it one of the best means to promote the principles of justice, love, freedom and human rights; values called for by Christianity everywhere.
Télé Lumière is supervised by the Assembly of Catholic Patriarchs and Bishops in Lebanon and directed by a committee involving religious leaders from various denominations and a group of laity eager to support this distinguished project. The relationship between the Church and Télé Lumière is organized through a "cooperation protocol".
As for the Government, it considers Télé Lumière, through the Assembly of Catholic Patriarchs and Bishops in Lebanon, a Christian station, financially independent and having freedom of management and programming controlled only by the authority of the Church.

Noursat

In June 2003, on Pentecost, Télé Lumière celebrated its 12th anniversary as well as the launching of its satellite station Noursat covering European Union, the Southwest Asia and North Africa. Actually (2020) the station is located at the A05 transponder of Eutelsat 7West-A at 7,3°W. One year later, at September 8th, 2004, Noursat began its official broadcast in North and South America, United States, Canada and Australia (platforms Mysat, MysatGo).

Board of directors

Board of Directors
Télé Lumière/Noursat board of directors:
Archbishop Roland Abou Jaoudé (President)
Jack Kallassi (General Manager)
Brother Nour (General Supervisor)
Rola Nassar (Financial Manager)
Dr. Antoine Saad (General Secretary)
Bishop George Riachi (member)
Father Khalil Alwan (member)
Neemat Frem (member)
George Moawad (member)
Sana Nassar (member)
Raymond Nader (Noursat Executive Director)

See also
Catholic television
Catholic television channels
Catholic television networks
Television in Lebanon

External links

1991 establishments in Lebanon
Christianity in Beirut
Christian media
Television channels and stations established in 1991
Mass media in Beirut
Television networks in Lebanon
Television stations in Lebanon
Arabic-language television stations